Immo Rittmeyer (born 6 January 1936) is a German former cyclist. His sporting career began with SC Karl-Marx-Stadt. He competed in the individual road race and team time trial events at the 1964 Summer Olympics.

References

External links
 

1936 births
Living people
German male cyclists
Olympic cyclists of the United Team of Germany
Cyclists at the 1964 Summer Olympics
People from Bezirk Leipzig
Cyclists from Saxony
People from Nordsachsen